Edward Lee Kwong Foo  is a former ambassador and businessman from Singapore. He completed his study at the National University of Singapore (Bachelor of Arts in History) in 1970.

Career
He started his career as a high commissioner to Brunei Darussalam (1984-1990). Following that, he served as Singapore's Ambassador to the Philippines from 1990 to 1993, and continued to be Singapore's Ambassador to Indonesia from 1994 to 2006. He supported Indonesia with humanitarian aid during the crisis in 1997/98.

He is on the board of two Singaporean public companies: Indofood Agri Resources and QAF as well the Indonesian food production company Dermaga Perkasa Pratama.

Awards
1993: Order of Sikatuna, Grand Cross by the Government of the Philippines
2007: Bintang Jasa Utama (First Class Order of Service Award) from the Indonesian government for the improvement of bilateral relationship between Singapore and Indonesia.

References 

Singaporean diplomats
Ambassadors of Singapore to Indonesia
Ambassadors of Singapore to the Philippines
University of Singapore alumni
1947 births
Living people